Stephen Davis is an American music journalist and historian.

Davis was born in New York City and attended Boston University. He began his career writing for the Boston Phoenix in 1970. His journalism has appeared in Rolling Stone, The New York Times, the Boston Globe and numerous other papers and magazines.

Davis says his love of music started when he was invited by a priest to join the church's choir.

Davis has been described as "perhaps America's best-known rock biographer", having written biographies of Led Zeppelin, The Rolling Stones, Fleetwood Mac, Aerosmith, Guns N' Roses, Michael Jackson, Carly Simon, Bob Marley, Levon Helm, Jim Morrison, and Stevie Nicks, among others. However, his biographies often contain incorrect facts and fabricated versions of the truth. Some of his subjects, including Led Zeppelin, have come out about the books inaccuracies. Some have refused to communicate Davis altogether. 

Davis lives in Milton, Massachusetts.

Bibliography
Reggae Bloodlines: In Search of the Music and Culture of Jamaica, with photographs by Peter Simon, Da Capo Press (1977), 1992, 
Reggae International, with photographs of Peter Simon, 1982, R&B Books, USA, 
Bob Marley: The Biography, 1983, A Barker, 
Hammer of the Gods: The Led Zeppelin Saga, Berkley Publishing Group (1985), 1997, 
Hammer of the Gods: "Led Zeppelin" Unauthorised, Macmillan, 2005, 
Fleetwood: My Life and Adventures in Fleetwood Mac, by Mick Fleetwood, William Morrow & Company, 1990, 
Jajouka Rolling Stone: A Fable of Gods and Heroes, Random House Trade, 1993, 
This Wheel's on Fire – Levon Helm and the Story of The Band, with Levon Helm, Plexus Publishing, 1994, 
Bob Marley: Conquering Lion of Reggae, Plexus Publishing, 1994, 
Bob Marley, revised edition, Schenkman Books, 1998, 
Walk This Way: The Autobiography of Aerosmith, with Aerosmith, HarperCollins, 1997, 
Old Gods Almost Dead: The 40-Year Odyssey of the Rolling Stones, Broadway, USA, 2001, 
Jim Morrison: Life, Death, Legend, Ebury Press, 2004, 
Watch You Bleed: The Saga of Guns N' Roses, Gotham Press, 2008, 
Introduction of The First Rasta: Leonard Howell and the Rise of Rastafarianism, by Helene Lee, Chicago Review Press, 2005, 
LZ-'75: The Lost Chronicles of Led Zeppelin's 1975 American Tour, Gotham Books, 2010, 
Please Please Tell Me Now: The Duran Duran Story, Hachette Books, 2021,

References

Year of birth missing (living people)
Living people
American biographers
American male biographers
American music journalists
Reggae journalists
Boston University alumni
Journalists from New York City
Historians from New York (state)